Percival C. Pearce (September 7, 1899 – July 4, 1955) was an American producer, director, and writer, best known for his work with Walt Disney Productions.

Early life
Born on September 7, 1899, in Waukegan, Illinois, Pearce was the son of English immigrants. His paternal grandfather had apprenticed as a druggist in Essex and moved to Waukegan around 1859. His father, Percival Pearce (Sr.), worked as a physicist while his aunt Winnifred worked as an artist. Pearce had two older siblings, a brother Stamford, and sister Isabel, and a younger sister named Margaret. At the age of ten, he started drawing, and when he was a high school freshman, his drawings had caught the attention of cartoonist J. Campbell Cory. While attending high school, Pearce pursued a career as a cartoonist. Following his graduation in 1918, he attended the Academy of Fine Arts in Chicago.

Career
When World War I was declared, Pearce was working as a cartoonist for The Chicago Herald and the Publicity Feature Bureau. He was briefly enlisted for naval service, but shortly after, he was asked to do a daily comic strip for the Great Lakes Bulletin, a military newspaper serving the Naval Station Great Lakes. Pearce then submitted his idea for "Seaman Si", which was approved by Captain William A. Moffett. The strip told of the eponymous sailor who constantly gets into trouble. The series was later published as a softcover in 1917, and reprinted as a book a year later. At the same time, Pearce did editorial cartoons and political caricatures for his news agency, some of which were published in the New York Evening Post. In 1919, Pearce moved to Colorado to work as a cartoonist for The Denver Post.

On February 18, 1935, Pearce began working with Walt Disney Productions. There, he was initially employed as an inbetweener, but by the end of the year, he was involved in the writing for Snow White and the Seven Dwarfs (1937). By October 1936, he was promoted as sequence director, where he was tasked to guide the animators in developing the dwarfs' personalities. According to author John Grant, Pearce additionally served as live-action reference for some of the dwarfs, most particularly for Doc. For Fantasia (1940), Walt Disney assigned Pearce as animation director on the segment "The Sorcerer's Apprentice", with Carl Fallberg assisting him on story. However, in January 1938, Pearce and Fallberg were reassigned to work on Bambi (1942).

For Bambi, Pearce, along with Larry Morey, was tasked to supervise the story team, in which he developed the characters' personalities as he did on Snow White. According to Ollie Johnston and Frank Thomas, Pearce "loved to act out the roles of the animals in the film. In the morning, it was the owl...Later, it might be the little mole who popped up out his burrow at Bambi's line". He also provided the voice for the mole. Afterwards, Pearce was involved in story direction for Victory Through Air Power (1943) and worked on the unproduced Gremlins project. By the mid-1940s, Pearce had become an assistant producer on Song of the South (1946) and So Dear to My Heart (1948). In November 1946, after the Atlanta premiere of Song of the South, Pearce traveled with Disney, his wife Lillian, and screenwriter John Tucker Battle to Ireland to research material for a potential film about leprechauns. The resulting project became Darby O'Gill and the Little People (1959).

To support their film industry, the United Kingdom impounded box office receipts earned by American studios, insisting the monies be spent there. Because the studio relied heavily on foreign markets, Disney established a film production studio in England so he could access the blocked funds. There, Disney selected Robert Louis Stevenson's Treasure Island as his first live-action film, tapping Pearce and Fred Leahy to supervise the production. Treasure Island (1950) became a box office success, earning $4.8 million in worldwide box office rentals. For their follow-up project, The Story of Robin Hood and His Merrie Men (1952), Pearce was again the producer. Before shooting, he had the film storyboarded and shipped the thumbnail sketches and the script to Disney for his approval.

Because of the postwar currency restrictions, Pearce could not take his earned salaries overseas; thus, he resided in England. Nevertheless, he assisted in developing The Mickey Mouse Club (1955–1959) along with Bill Walsh and Hal Adelquist. One of his contributions was the appearance of the puppet Sooty (operated by Harry Corbett) during the series' first two seasons.

Personal life
On July 4, 1955, Pearce died at his London home after suffering a heart attack. He was survived by his wife and two daughters; one of whom named Anne was married to Stanley Kramer.

Filmography

References

Bibliography

External links
 

1899 births
1955 deaths
20th-century American businesspeople
American animators
American animated film directors
American animated film producers
American comic strip cartoonists
American film producers
American male voice actors
American people of English descent
American storyboard artists
Film directors from Illinois
Film producers from Illinois
People from Waukegan, Illinois
Walt Disney Animation Studios people
Deaths from coronary artery disease